Uniondale is a small town in the Little Karoo in the Western Cape Province, South Africa. The town was formed in 1856 by the joining of two towns, Hopedale and Lyons. Its primary claim to fame is the ghost story of the Uniondale hitcher. The town is connected by the N9 road and the R339 road.

The Ghost of Uniondale

In stormy weather on Easter weekend of 1968 a young engaged couple had a car accident on the Barandas-Willowmore road around 20 kilometres from the town. The woman, Maria Charlotte Roux, was sleeping in the back seat of their Volkswagen Beetle when her fiancé lost control of the car. The car overturned and she was killed.

The first reported sighting of a ghost matching her description occurred during the Easter weekend of 1976, and since then many other sightings have been reported. All involve a female hitchhiker who is given a lift, then disappears a few kilometers down the road, and some have reported car doors opening and closing, laughter and a chill in the air.

This is a newspaper article from the Daily Breeze newspaper, Torrance, California. Dated Friday, April 11, 1980.
The article reads as follows: The motorcycle ghost of the Karoo Desert has struck again. The ghost, said to be a woman who died in a motorcycle accident more than 10 years ago near Uniondale, badly frightened Andre Coetzee, 20, who was breezing along the highway on Good Friday.

 the shaken Coetzee said.

The frightened motorcyclist said he accelerated to 80 mph to get away, but the ghost hit him three times in the helmet to get him to slow down. 'The blows were vicious,' he said. When he reached 100 mph, Coetzee said, 'the apparition disappeared.'

Coetzee drove to a local cafe for help.  said Jeanetta Meyer, the cafe owner.

There have been several reports in recent years of motorcyclists picking up a blonde woman hitchhiker near Uniondale, only to find that she had vanished from the back seat after a few miles.

This story has many of the basic characteristics of the well-known Vanishing Hitchhiker urban legend, which was described thus by Ernest W. Baughman:

Ghost of young woman asks for ride in automobile, disappears from closed car without the driver's knowledge, after giving him an address to which she wishes to be taken. The driver asks person at the address about the rider, finds she has been dead for some time. (Often the driver finds that the ghost has made similar attempts to return, usually on the anniversary of death in automobile accident. Often, too, the ghost leaves some item such as a scarf or traveling bag in the car.)[]

See also
All Saints Church

References

External links

Maria Charlotta Roux (1945-1968)
Getaway magazine article on the ghost
SA Venues article on Uniondale
GO24 article on Uniondale and the ghost

Karoo
Populated places established in 1856
Populated places in the George Local Municipality